The General Code of Operating Rules (GCOR) is a set of operating rules for railroads in the United States. The GCOR is used by Class I railroads west of Chicago, most of the Class II railroads, and many Short-line railroads.

Some railroads in northeast United States follow NORAC, while Canada and Mexico have their own set of operating rules that govern their railroad operations.

Overview
The GCOR rules are intended to enhance railroad safety. The rules cover employee responsibilities, signaling equipment, procedures for safe train movement, dealing with accidents and other topics that directly and indirectly affect railroad safety. Some railroads modify the GCOR rules to suit their specific operations.

The GCOR is supplemented by System Special Instructions, Timetables, Hazardous Materials Instructions, Air Brake and Train Handling Instructions, and General Orders.  These documents are issued by each individual railroad.  System Special instructions, Timetables, and General Order can modify or amend the General Code of Operating Rules.  GCOR 1.3.2 states that General Orders replace any rule, special instruction, or regulation that conflicts with the general order.

Some railroads will maintain what they call a "living rulebook."  As amendments are released via general order or special instruction, they will update the specific page that was affected.

The current version of the GCOR is the Eighth Edition, effective April 1, 2020.

Categories
The full set of GCOR rules is divided into 19 categories.
General Responsibilities
Railroad Radio and Communication Rules
Section Reserved
Timetables
Signals and Their Use
Movement of Trains and Engines
Switching
Switches
Block System Rules
Rules Applicable Only in Centralized Traffic Control (CTC)
Rules Applicable in ACS, ATC and ATS Territories
Rules Applicable Only in Automatic Train Stop (ATS) Territory
Rules Applicable Only in Automatic Cab Signal System (ACS) Territory
Rules Applicable Only Within Track Warrant Control (TWC) Limits
Track Bulletin Rules
Rules Applicable Only in Direct Traffic Control (DTC) Limits
Rules Applicable Only in Automatic Train Control (ATC) Territory
Rules Applicable Only in Positive Train Control (PTC) Territory
Section Reserved

See also
Northeast Operating Rules Advisory Committee
Canadian Rail Operating Rules

References

External links
U S Department of Transportation - Compliance with Railroad Operating Rules and Corporate Culture Influences, October 1999
General Code of Operating Rules, April 7, 2010
General Code of Operating Rules, April 1, 2015

Railway signaling in the United States
Railway signaling in Canada
Railway signaling in Mexico